The League of Ireland Premier Division Manager of the Month award is a monthly award given to the best manager in the top flight of Irish football.

Selection panel 

The selection is made by the Soccer Writers' Association of Ireland, commonly known as the SWAI.

Past winners

2009

League of Ireland Premier Division
League of Ireland trophies and awards
Republic of Ireland association football trophies and awards